Souvenirs d'un autre monde (English: "Memories From Another World") is the first full-length album by French band Alcest, released in August 2007. The title refers to the meaning behind the music of Alcest, as its leader and songwriter, Neige, sees it as a journey through his memories of a distant world he has been in contact with.

Although it is representative of future works, the album differs greatly from Alcest's first release Le Secret, distancing itself further from Alcest's original sound, and going more into post-metal and shoegaze-like direction while keeping some of the black metal part of the sound. It is the last release in which Neige plays all instruments, as he was joined by drummer Winterhalter on subsequent releases.

Reception

The album received generally positive reviews. Brian Way of Allmusic lauded the emotional aspect of the album, stating it expressed "yearning, nostalgia, triumph and blissful peace, all without a single lyric in (discernible) English". Many reviewers noted the unique stylistic influences on the album, with Brad Angle of Revolver describing the album as "unexpectedly profound and affecting. Where many black metal records tunnel inward to the dark centers of their authors, Souvenirs d'un autre monde looks outward and upward, encouraging the listener to release its grasp on reality and float into the ether."

Kyle Ward of Sputnik Music was less impressed with the album, writing that "The ideas presented in Souvenirs d'un autre monde are solid, and rather revolutionary for the genre, but the songwriting is so blatantly flawed that any hope of this fantastic idea coming to realization are swiftly carried away, never to return again."

In 2016, Pitchfork Media ranked the album at number 32 in its list of "The 50 Best Shoegaze Albums of All Time", saying:

Track listing

Personnel
 Alcest
 Neige – lead and backing vocals, guitars, bass, keyboards, drums

 Additional personnel
 Audrey Sylvain – vocals on "Sur l'autre rive je t'attendrai"
 Fursy Teyssier – Cover art

References

2007 debut albums
Alcest albums
Profound Lore Records albums